Igbekele Amos Ajibefun (born 28 July 1964) is a Nigerian professor of Agricultural economics, former Rector of Rufus Giwa Polytechnic and former Vice chancellor of Adekunle Ajasin University. He is the fifth substantive Vice Chancellor of Adekunle Ajasin.

Early life
Ajibefun was born in Irele, local government area of Ondo State, southwestern Nigeria on 28 July 1964.
He had his secondary education at United Grammar School, Ode-Irele in Ondo State, where he obtained the west African School Certificate 1983 before he proceeded to the Federal University of Technology Akure where he received a bachelor's degree in Farm Management and Extension in 1990.

He later attended the University of Ibadan where he obtained a master's degree in Agricultural economics in 1992 before he returned to his alma mater where he was awarded a doctorate (Ph.D.) degree in Agricultural economics.

Career
He joined the services of Federal University of Technology, Akure in 1993 as assistant lecturer and was appointed a professor on 1 October 2009.

In November 2010, he was appointed Rector of Rufus Giwa Polytechnic. He held this position until he was appointed as Vice chancellor of Adekunle Ajasin University, to succeed professor Nahzeem Olufemi Mimiko whose tenure elapsed in January 2015.

Membership
Member, European Society for Soil Conservation (ESSC)
International Association for Agricultural Economists (IAAE)
African Economic Research Consortium (AERC) Network
Asian Society of Agricultural Economists (ASAE)
Nigerian Economic Society 
Nigerian Participatory Rural Appraisal Network (NIPRANET) and Conference of Heads of Polytechnics in Nigeria.

References

Academic staff of Rufus Giwa Polytechnic
Living people
1964 births
People from Ondo State
Federal University of Technology Akure alumni
University of Ibadan alumni
Academic staff of the Federal University of Technology Akure
Yoruba agriculturalists
Nigerian agriculturalists
Rufus Giwa Polytechnic people
Academic staff of Adekunle Ajasin University